IHEP may refer to:
 Institute for High Energy Physics  Protvino, Moscow, Russia
 Institute of High Energy Physics, Chinese Academy of Sciences